The Purity of Perversion is the debut studio album by Belgian death metal band Aborted.

Track listing

Personnel
Sven "Svencho" de Caluwé – vocals
Koen Verstraete – bass
Niek Verstraete – guitars
Frank Rosseau – drums
Christophe "Herre" Herreman – guitars

Aborted (band) albums
1999 albums